George Ionuț Dragomir (born 6 August 2003) is a Romanian professional footballer who plays as a midfielder for Liga I side FC Botoșani.

Honours
Sepsi OSK 
Cupa României: 2021–22
Supercupa României: 2022

References

External links
 
 

2003 births
Living people
People from Brăila County
Romanian footballers
Association football midfielders
Sepsi OSK Sfântu Gheorghe players
FC Botoșani players
Liga I players